Rotwelsch ("beggar's foreign (language)") or Gaunersprache ( "crook's language") also Kochemer Loshn (from Yiddish "", "tongue of the wise") is a secret language, a cant or thieves' argot, spoken by groups (primarily marginalized groups) in Germany, Switzerland, Austria, and Bohemia. The language is based on a mix of Yiddish, Hebrew, Romani, Latin, and Czech with a German substrate.

Name 
Rotwelsch was first named by Martin Luther in his preface of Liber Vagatorum in the 16th century. Rot means "beggar" while welsch means "incomprehensible": thus, rotwelsch signifies the incomprehensible cant of beggars.

History
 was formerly common among travelling craftspeople and vagrants. The language is built on a strong substratum of German, but contains numerous words from other languages, notably from various German dialects, and other Germanic languages like Yiddish, as well as from Romany languages, notably Sintitikes.  has also played a great role in the development of the Yeniche language. In form and development it closely parallels the commercial speech ("shopkeeper language") of German-speaking regions.

During the 19th and 20th century, Rotwelsch was the object of linguistic repression, with systematic investigation by the German police.

Examples
  =  (coffee)
  =  (to work)
  =  (master artisan)
  =  (waistcoat)
  = ,  (barber)
  =  (walking stick)
  =  (to beg)
  =  (to seek lodging)
  =  (policeman)

From Feraru's Muskel-Adolf & Co. 
From:
 Peter Feraru: Muskel-Adolf & Co.: Die ›Ringvereine‹ und das organisierte Verbrechen in Berlin [Muscle-Adolf & Co.: The ›Ring-Clubs‹ and Organised Crime in Berlin]. Argon, Berlin 1995.

  = to arrest (literally 'touch off', secondary: 'to write out')
  = to eat (from Hebrew)
  = to go acquire; to go off the line (literally 'to till or cultivate')
  = to get drunk (literally 'to buy the ape')
  = to be arrested; to vanish into thin air
  = to testify against someone, to 'betray' them
  = to revolt against orders
  = to hang (literally 'to grease up')
  = the hanged man
  = to spy out; to make inquiries about (perhaps from Hebrew  = one who brings an accusation)
  = examining magistrate (from Hebrew  = Master of Law)
  = the prison or penitentiary (literally 'the lodge')
  = a stupid simple-minded person (literally 'peasant' or 'farmer')
  = to be hunted for a long time (literally 'to be buried')
  = by day (Hebrew  = day)
  = by night (Hebrew  = night)
  = the prison toilet
  = to swindle
  = to pay up or fork over money (literally 'to plaster a wall'); also possibly from Malayan through Dutch: berapa means 'how much?' (what does it cost), now integrated in Dutch as : to pay.
  = discreet or imperceptible (perhaps from Hebrew betokh = within)
  = a small bell (from )
  (or ) = to threaten. Possibly from Dutch: : to bark (like a dog).
 , from Romani  = hunger, coll.  = to be up for something.
  = coffee glass (literally 'bombshell')
  (literally 'to burn') = Extortion, but also to collect the "thieves' portion" with companions. The analogy between distilling spirits and taking a good gulp of the portion is obvious.

Current status
Variants of Rotwelsch, sometimes toned down, can still be heard among travelling craftspeople and funfair showpeople as well as among vagrants and beggars. Also, in some southwestern and western locales in Germany, where travelling peoples were settled, many Rotwelsch terms have entered the vocabulary of the vernacular, for instance in the municipalities of Schillingsfürst and Schopfloch. Some Rotwelsch- and Yenish-speaking vagrant communities also exist in Switzerland due the country's neutral status during World War Two.

The Manisch dialect of the German city of Gießen is still used, although it was only spoken fluently by approximately 700-750 people in 1976.

Code 
Josef Ludwig Blum from Lützenhardt (Black Forest) wrote from war prison:

"[E]s grüßt Dich nun recht herzlich Dein Mann, viele Grüße an Schofel und Bock. Also nochmals viel Glück auf ein baldiges Wiedersehen in der schönen Heimat. Viele Grüße an Mutter u. Geschwister sowie an die Deinen."

The censors allowed the passage to remain, apparently believing that Bock and Schofel were people.

In arts
A variant of Rotwelsch was spoken by some American criminal groups in the 1930s and the 1940s, and harpist Zeena Parkins' 1996 album Mouth=Maul=Betrayer made use of spoken Rotwelsch texts.

An example of Rotwelsch is found in Gustav Meyrink's Der Golem and reads as follows:

See also
 Germanía
 Grypsera
 Lotegorisch
 Polari
 Yenish

Notes and references

References

Further reading 
 
 Sobota, Heinz. 1978. Der Minus-Mann, Verlag Kiepenheuer und Witsch.
 Wolf, S.A.: Wörterbuch des Rotwelschen. Deutsche Gaunersprache, 1985/1993, 431 pp.,

External links
 
 Rothwelſch, German cant dictionaries from 1510 to 1901 

Cant languages
Languages of Germany
Yenish people
Languages of Switzerland
Occupational cryptolects